The Association for the Development of Education in Africa, previously known as "Donors to African Education", is a "network and partnership" established by a World Bank initiative in 1988. It groups Ministries of Education, international Development Agencies, NGOs and education specialists.

It currently focuses on helping Ministers of Education and funding agencies to coordinate their efforts to create successful education policies based on African leadership. ADEA has also become aware of the informal sector's relevance, and thus recognized the need for increased vocational school training as a way to help the informal sector. "Diverse forms of learning"

ADEA is based in Tunis at the African Development Bank (AfDB) since August 1, 2008.

ADEA publishes a newsletter ADEA newsletter to inform about its activities.

Programs 
Programs include:
 The Africa Education Journalism Award, launched in 2001
 Triennale (formerly Biennial) Meetings of Ministers of Education, development agency representatives and related professionals. Meetings:
2003: held in Grand Baie, Mauritius, with a theme of "Improving the Quality of Education in sub-Saharan Africa"
2001: held in Arusha, Tanzania with a theme of "Reaching Out, Reaching All: Sustaining Effective Policies and Practices for Education in Africa!".
1999: held in Johannesburg, South Africa, with a theme of "What works and Whats new in Education : Africa Speaks!"
Prospective, Stock-Taking Review of Education in Africa
Identifying Effective Responses to HIV/AIDS
Intra-African Exchanges

References 

http://www.adeanet.org

International organizations based in Africa
Education in Africa
World Bank
Organizations established in 1988
Organisations based in Tunis
International organisations based in Tunisia
International educational organizations